= 1961 Cambodian school holiday referendum =

A referendum on shortening school holidays was held in Cambodia on 12 January 1961. The proposed change was approved by voters.
